Lomachantha is a genus of parasitic flies in the family Tachinidae.

Species
Lomachantha parra Rondani, 1859
Lomachantha rufitarsis Villeneuve, 1912

References

Exoristinae
Tachinidae genera
Taxa named by Camillo Rondani
Diptera of Africa
Diptera of Europe
Diptera of Asia